Völgyi is a Hungarian surname. Notable people with the surname include:

Dániel Völgyi (born 1987), Hungarian footballer
Péter Völgyi, Hungarian sprint canoeist

Hungarian-language surnames